"Anybody Else But You" is a song by UK hardcore duo Dougal & Gammer. It is the first commercial release from the act and was released on January 30, 2011.

The song was nominated for Track of the Year at the Hardcore Heaven Awards 2010. It has been featured on many dance compilations including both Clubland 17 and Clubland 18.

Track listing

Digital single
Radio Edit
Extended Mix
Friday Night Posse Remix
E-Tech Remix
Jorg Schmid Remix
Hardino Remix

CD Promo
Radio Edit
Extended Mix
Jorg Schmid Remix
Friday Night Posse Remix
Hardino Remix

Music video
The music video was premiered on Clubland TV in October 2010 where it became the number one requested video. The video is based around the story of Alice In Wonderland, set in various locations from the story. It also features Dougal & Gammer themselves.

References 

2011 singles
DJ Dougal songs